Du Yun (traditional Chinese: 杜韻, simplified Chinese: 杜韵) is a Chinese-born American composer, performer, vocalist and performance artist. She won the 2017 Pulitzer Prize for Music for her opera Angel's Bone, with libretto by Royce Vavrek.  She was a 2018 Guggenheim Fellow. Du Yun was named as one of the 38 Great Immigrants by the Carnegie Corporation of New York in 2018, and received a 2019 Grammy nomination in the category of Best Classical Contemporary Composition for her work Air Glow. In its decade review, UK's Classic FM listed Du Yun's winning of the Pulitzer as No. 6 in "10 ways the 2010s changed classical music forever." Rolling Stone Italia named her as one of the women composers who defined the 2010s.

Early life and education 

Du Yun was born in Shanghai, China. She began studying piano at the age of four, attending the primary school Shanghai Conservatory of Music for piano. She studied composition at the middle school Shanghai Conservatory of Music with Deng Erbo. Du Yun later moved to the United States and graduated from the Oberlin Conservatory of Music with a Bachelor of Music degree in composition, under Randolph Coleman, and received a Ph.D. in music composition from Harvard University with Bernard Rands and Mario Davidovsky.

On her earlier years growing up in Shanghai, Du Yun recounted, in her contribution to WQXR, that neither of her parents went to college and both were factory workers in China.

When Du Yun studied in junior high school in Shanghai, she collected cassette tapes from singer Faye Wong, Chen Sheng, Dou Wei, Pink Floyd and Michael Jackson. She counts Dou Wei and Faye Wong as among the Chinese pop musicians who have had the most influence on her musical life. She credits filmmakers Wong Kar-Wai and Quentin Tarantino as some of the major influences on her style.

When she studied in high school, she spent pocket money on CDs that had impactful covers. Pink Floyd, Cocteau Twins, Björk, Sinead O'Connor, and Kraftwerk entered her world all at once. She indulged in Krautrock, and psychedelic rock.

During her first year of college, British band Portishead released a new album, and Du Yun fell into the world of trip hop. Her psychedelic style was later used in many of her works, and in 2012, she released her first studio album, Shark in You, which featured a variety of styles, from experimental dance music to cabaret and jazz electronic music.

Director Stan Lai has collaborated with Du Yun twice.  He said her music not only has the background of classical music, but also is multifaceted, influenced by pop and folk music.

Career 
Du Yun won the Pulitzer Prize for Music for her opera Angel's Bone in 2017, making her the first Asian woman to win this prize in music. The opera's production in Hong Kong in 2018 won the best of the performances of the year by the South China Morning Post.

In 2006, Du Yun joined the composition faculty at the State University of New York-Purchase. In 2017, she joined the composition faculty at Peabody Institute of Johns Hopkins University.  She is the Professor of Composition at Peabody. In 2017, she was also appointed as the distinguished visiting professor at the Shanghai Conservatory of Music.

From 2014 to 2018, Du Yun was the Artistic Director of the MATA Festival in New York City.

An avid performer, Du Yun's engagement include the 2018 Lahore Biennial (Pakistan), the 2012 Guangzhou Art Triennial (Guangzhou Opera House, China), the National Academy Museum (USA), the inaugural Shanghai Project (China). She also leads her bank Ok Miss, which exists both as rock bank and chamber music ensemble.

In 2020, China's leading record label, Modern Sky, announced its three-year record deal with Du Yun.

Du Yun lives and works from New York City. She uses her whole name, Du Yun, not Du, for professional and personal uses.

Compositions 

Her works include compositions for solo instruments, electroacoustic music, chamber music, orchestral works, opera, indie pop, punk, theatre, oral tradition music, sound installations, and performance art pieces. Du's works have been performed internationally in venues such as Carnegie Hall, the Guangzhou Opera House, the Salle Pleyel Paris, the Sibelius Academy in Helsinki, Escola de Música do Estado in São Paulo, the Darmstädter Ferienkurse in Germany, and London's Southbank Centre. She has written for the New York Philharmonic, the Seattle Symphony Orchestra, the Detroit Symphony Orchestra, the LA Philharmonic, and the San Francisco Contemporary Music Players, as well as solo artists Hilary Hahn and Matt Haimovitz.

On April 10, 2017, she was awarded the Pulitzer Prize for Music for her second opera, Angel's Bone. The citation for the prize reads: "Premiered on January 6, 2016, at the Prototype Festival, 3LD Arts and Technology Center, New York City, a bold operatic work that integrates vocal and instrumental elements and a wide range of styles into a harrowing allegory for human trafficking in the modern world. Libretto by Royce Vavrek."

She is the composer of the musical Dim Sum Warriors, based on a graphic novel and bilingual iPad app series about Kung Fu-fighting dumplings by the Singaporean filmmaker, satirist, and cartoonist Colin Goh and Yenyen Woo. Dim Sum Warriors was made into a Chinese musical which was produced by Stan Lai. The musical debuted on August 11, 2017, to sold-out audiences at Theatre Above in Shanghai, and went on to tour in 25 major cities in China the following year.

Her work with the Palestine artist Khaled Jarrrar, "Where We Lost Our Shadows", is based on a trip that Khaled took with a family of Syrian refugee from Greece to Berlin. The work was co-commissioned by Carnegie Hall, London's Southbank Centre, the Kennedy Center, American Composers Orchestra and CalPerformances. Its documentary was on the National Geographic's Human Journey Series. The work is for three soloists, orchestra and video.

In 2020, her site-specific opera Sweet Land, co-composed with composer Raven Chacon, premiered in LA with the opera company The Industry, directed by Yuval Sharon, Cannupa Hanska Luger. Sweet Land is a double-team work, with libretto by Aja Couchois and Douglas Kearney. The Los Angeles Times named it a best classical music moment in 2020, a parable of, and fantasia on, manifest destiny.
It won the Best 2021 New Opera by The Music Critics Association of North America. The album, released in 2021, was a Notable recording of 2021 by The New Yorker.

Du Yun's concert music is published by G. Schirmer, Inc.

Performing artist 

Du Yun's performing persona on stage has been called "utterly extraordinary, unrestrained performance."

Du Yun leads the band Ok Miss. According to The New Yorker, "the one predictable thing about Du Yun … is her unpredictability. Dig deeper, though, and you can sense the conjoined strands of curiosity and compassion that run through everything she makes. On the first two nights of her Stone residency, her art-pop band, OK Miss, ventures through breathy Chinese pop, seductive trip-hop, and metallic skronk."

Visual art 

Du Yun has done works for the Guangzhou Triennial, The Shanghai Project, Cordoba Contemporary Arts Center, and the Sharjah Biennial.

Other work 
Du Yun is an advocate for women, racial equality and social justice. In an interview with NPR on gender in classical music, she said: "I think this is the issue — larger and deeper than the debate of discrimination at hand. Any sustainable and viable career paths cannot and should not depend on a few people's luck." Speaking to Foreign Policy on art's power in politics, she said: "A lot of times politics, global issues, are very black and white... There is a place for that, but it's also fantastic to have art side by side, from different viewpoints open for interpretations."

Du Yun founded and curated the Pan Asia Sounding Festival at National Sawdust in March 2018, as part of the Spring Revolution. "I want to demystify Asian culture. I want to question who owns the culture and bring together the divisions we have in society," she told the New York News Channel PIX11.

Du Yun started a global initiative FutureTradition to advocate folk arts and promote cross regional collaborations. The works are with many collaborations cross-regions. When All About Jazz covered her keynote speech for the European Jazz Conference in 2019, Ian Patterson wrote:

Critical reception 

Du Yun is regarded as "leading force on the New York Scene," and "one of China's leading young composers."  Her onstage performing persona has been described as "adventurously eclectic" and "an indie diva with avant garde edge" by The New York Times. She has been selected by NPR as one of the 100 most influential young composers under 40 in 2011.  She was named one of the top 35 female composers in classical music by The Washington Post. Her work for Jennifer Koh, Give Me Back My Fingerprints, is listed as Top 25 Classical Music Tracks of 2019 by The New York Times. Her studio albums Angel's Bone, Dinosaur Scar, A Cockroach's Tarantella and Sweet Land are listed as Notable Recordings of The Year in 2017, 2018, 2020, and 2021 respectively, by The New Yorker.

In its decade review, UK's Classical FM listed Du Yun's winning of Pulitzer as No. 6 in "10 ways the 2010s changed classical music forever." Rolling Stone Italia named her as one of the women composers who defined the 2010s.

Works

Opera 

 In Our Daughter's Eyes
 Sweet Land
 Angel's Bone
 Zolle with A Cockroach's Tarantella

Orchestral 

 Slow Portraits
 Kraken
 Mantichora
 Hundred Heads
 Impeccable Quake

Soloist(s) and orchestra

 Where We Lost Our Shadows (2019)
 Thirst (2018)

Chamber music 

 Vicissitudes No. 1
 by of... Lethean
 Your eyes are not your eyes
 Air Glow
 A Few Stops on the N Train
 A Few Stops on the 7 Train
 Tattooed in Snow
 Every Grass A Spring

Solo with or without electronics 

 give me back my fingerprints
 The Veronica
 Run in a Graveyard
 When a Tiger Meets a Rosa Rugosa
 An Empty Garlic
 San
 Dinosaur Scar
 Ixtab, 10pm

Performance art 

 How are you doing, the future that has never left
 How are you doing, the past that comes around the corner
 Run

Musical 

 Dim Sum Warriors (book by Colin Goh)

Theatre 

 Love in a Fallen City, 傾城之戀, 2021 in Mandarin (written by Eileen Chang directed by Timmy Yip 葉錦添 )
 Writing in Water, 水中之書, 2016 in Mandarin (written/dir by Stan Lai 賴聲川)
 Kung Fu (written by David Henry Hwang 黃哲倫)

Collaborations with Shahzia Sikander 

 Disruption as Rapture
 Parallax
 Singing Suns
 The Last Post

Discography 
Studio albums
Sweet Land (2021, Industry Records)
A Cockroach's Tarantella (2020, Modern Sky)
 Du Yun, JACK Quartet
Dinosaur Scar (2018, Tundra)
 International Contemporary Ensemble, Du Yun
 Air Glow – Grammy Nomination for Best Classical Contemporary Composition, 2019
Angel's Bone (2017, VIA Records, label name changed to National Sawdust Tracks in 2017)
 Lead cast: Abigail Fischer, Kyle Pfortmiller, Jennifer Charles, Kyle Bielfield
 The Choir of Trinity Wall Street
 Julian Wachner, conductor
 FA Angel's Bone
Shark in You (2012, New Focus Recordings), CD, digital and vinyl
 Shark in You

Compilations

 Retrospective (2018, Deutsche Grammophon)
 Hilary Hahn, violin
Overtures to Bach (2016, Oxingale Records/Pendatone)
 Matt Haimovitz, 'cello
 Juno Award Nomination for Classical Album of the Year, 2017
Orbit (2015, Oxingale Records/Pendatone)
 Matt Haimovitz, 'cello
 In 27 Pieces: the Hilary Hahn Encores (2013, Deutsche Grammophon)
 Hilary Hahn, violin
 Cory Smythe, piano
 Grammy Award for Best Chamber Music/Small Ensemble Performance, 2014
Figment (2009, Oxingale Records)
 Matt Haimovitz, 'cello
Aliento (2009, New Focus Recordings)
 Claire Chase, flute and electronics
Abandoned Time (2008, New Focus Recordings)
 International Contemporary Ensemble

Collaborations 

Notable collaborations include with visual artist Shahzia Sikander, flutist Claire Chase, and librettist Royce Vavrek.

Honors and recognitions
2023: Vilcek Prize in Music 
2022: Creative Capital Award
2021: Best 2021 New Opera - Music Critics Association of North America Award for Best New Opera  - Sweet Land
2021: Asia Society Hong Kong Center – Honoree in Performing Arts
2021: American Academy in Berlin – Berlin Prize
2021: Foundation for Contemporary Arts – Music/Sound
2019: Beijing Music Festival – Artist of the Year
2019: BraVo International Professional Music Award – Moscow – Best Classical Composition
2018: Great Immigrants – Carnegie Foundation
2018: Guggenheim Fellowship
2017: Pulitzer Prize for Music – Opera Angel's Bone
2017: Asian Cultural Council
2016: New York Foundation for the Arts, Sound, fellow
2015: Civitella Ranieri Foundation
2011: Detroit Symphony Orchestra's Elaine Lebenbom Award
2011: Philadelphia Music Project – Pew Charitable Trusts.
2009: Rockefeller Foundation – Bellagio 
2008: Chamber Music America
2007: Fromm Music Foundation

References

External links

Profile page at sfcmp.org
Galli, Brianne (Apr. 2011). "Composer Du Yun's Daring Music is a Highlight of The Kitchen's 21c Liederabend Art Song Festival". ASCAP.  Obtained July 26, 2013.

1977 births
Living people
American people of Chinese descent
Pulitzer Prize for Music winners
American women classical composers
American classical composers
Chinese women classical composers
21st-century classical composers
Harvard Graduate School of Arts and Sciences alumni
Oberlin Conservatory of Music alumni
Women opera composers
American opera composers
Chinese opera composers
Chinese performance artists
Chinese classical composers
21st-century American composers
Peabody Institute faculty
State University of New York at Purchase faculty
21st-century Chinese composers
Musicians from Shanghai
21st-century American women musicians
21st-century women composers